Guatteria ecuadorensis is a species of plant in the Annonaceae family. It is endemic to Ecuador.  Its natural habitat is subtropical or tropical moist lowland forests. It is threatened by habitat loss.

References

 Muriel, P. & Pitman, N. 2003.  Guatteria ecuadorensis.   2006 IUCN Red List of Threatened Species.   Downloaded on 21 August 2007.

ecuadorensis
Endemic flora of Ecuador
Vulnerable flora of South America
Taxonomy articles created by Polbot